Smithwick's Creek Primitive Baptist Church is a historic Primitive Baptist church located near Farm Life, Martin County, North Carolina. It was built about 1897, and is a front-gable, unadorned frame building.  The building measures 44 feet, 4 inches, wide and 60 feet, 4 inches deep.  Also on the property is the former Smithwick's Creek Baptismal House, built in 1892 and moved to site November 2003.

It was added to the National Register of Historic Places in 2005.

References

Baptist churches in North Carolina
Churches on the National Register of Historic Places in North Carolina
Churches completed in 1897
19th-century Baptist churches in the United States
Churches in Martin County, North Carolina
National Register of Historic Places in Martin County, North Carolina
Primitive Baptists